Miguel Figueroa (born July 29, 1952) is a Canadian political activist who was the leader of the Communist Party of Canada from 1992 to 2015. He is known for the landmark Figueroa case, which redefined the role of small parties and Canadian Parliamentary democracy, as well as his role re-establishing the Communist Party of Canada in the post-Soviet era.

Early political career
Figueroa was born in Montreal, Quebec, Canada. He attended Dawson College, McGill and Concordia in Montreal, before joining the staff of the National Union of Students in 1975 as a national field organizer.

Figueroa joined the Communist Party in 1977 and held many positions within the Party. In 1978, he became the party's Greater Vancouver organizer, working with people such as city councilors Harry Rankin and Bruce Yorke as well as Party activists across the region. He also helped organize demonstrations which brought scores of thousands onto the streets, marching for nuclear disarmament.

From 1986 to 1992, Figueroa served as regional correspondent for the Canadian Tribune and the Party's Atlantic region leader. He was based in Halifax, but traveled across Nova Scotia, New Brunswick and Newfoundland on a regular basis. In 1991 Figueroa was laid off (a casualty of the inner-party struggle which had begun to brew), and he decided to go back to school, beginning a Master's program in International Development Studies at St. Mary's University, while working as a teaching assistant at neighbouring Dalhousie University. In 1992–93, Figueroa chaired a union organizing committee that signed up 800 part-time seasonal professors and teaching assistants at Dalhousie, ultimately leading to membership in the Canadian Union of Public Employees. He was also active in various mass movements like peace and disarmament, international solidarity, and trade union organizing.

Leadership of the Communist Party of Canada
The dissolution of the Soviet Union produced sharply different assessments within the CPC.

The protracted ideological, political, organizational and legal battle created much confusion and disorientation within the ranks of the Party, and paralysed both its independent and united front work for over two years. Ultimately, the Hewison-led majority in the party's Central Committee and Central 28th Convention voted to abandon Marxism-Leninism. An orthodox minority, led by Elizabeth Rowley, Figueroa and former leader William Kashtan, resisted this effort. As the inner-party conflict intensified, the Hewison leadership expelled Rowley and 10 other leading opponents of the reformist orientation being imposed, and the moves to liquidate the party entirely. In August 1991, Rowley and the other expelled members took the Communist Party to court. An out-of-court settlement resulted in the Hewison leadership relinquishing the name "Communist Party of Canada", and in return split the party's assets with the Hewison group under the umbrella of the Cecil-Ross Society, a publishing and educational foundation previously associated with the party.

A convention was held in December 1992 in which delegates declared themselves to be the continuation of the Communist Party (thus the meeting was titled the 30th CPC Convention). Delegates rejected the changes instituted by Hewison and reaffirmed the CPC as a Marxist-Leninist organization. Since half of the old party's assets were now the property of the Hewison-led Cecil Ross Society, the CPC convention decided to launch a new newspaper, the People's Voice, to replace the Canadian Tribune and Pacific Tribune.

Elected leader in December 1992 at the 30th Party Convention, Figueroa was re-elected to that office until his resignation in January 2016, for health reasons. Over his 23-year term, Figueroa led the party through eight federal election campaigns, touring and speaking across the country. As part of a new collective leadership, he worked to help achieve what the Party considers the clarification of its revolutionary orientation as well as its ideological identity based on Marxism-Leninism. In particular, Figueroa participated in the elaboration of the Party's new political program, Canada’s Future is Socialism!, a process which began in the mid-1990s and culminated in the adoption of the final version at the 33rd Central Convention in February 2001.

His leadership also saw the consolidation and rebuilding of the Communist Party across the country — helping to launch People’s Voice and, later, Clarté, as well as The Spark! , the CPC's theoretical and discussion journal. The Party re-established several clubs and committees, including the Party's Quebec component the Communist Party of Quebec, as well as the youth organization known as the Young Communist League. The Party continues to play a role in many labour, peace, environmental, aboriginal, women's, student, immigrant and other people's movements.

Figueroa chaired the international commission of the Party and represented the CPC around the world, including Greece, Portugal, India, China, Vietnam, South Africa, Cuba, Venezuela and the United States. He was regularly present at the International Meeting of Communist and Workers' Parties where, on behalf of the Party, he advocated for efforts to build greater cooperation, political cohesion, and unity of action among Communist and Workers’ parties to deal with the growing dangers of imperialism and urgent problems of peace, solidarity and protection of the global environment.

The 38th Central Convention of the CPC was held May 21–23, 2016 in Toronto. The Convention included a tribute to Miguel Figueroa for his lengthy service as party leader; it also elected Elizabeth Rowley as the new national leader. Figueroa was elected to the new 23-member Central Committee.

Recent History
In October 2016, Figueroa was invited to join the Executive of the Canadian Peace Congress, and was subsequently appointed "interim President" in early 2017. He organized several speaking tours with Eva Bartlett and Canadian author Stephen Gowans in the winter and spring of 2017, and undertook a Canada-wide tour in the fall of 2017, which covered 13 cities across the country. He also represented the Peace Congress in solidarity missions to Venezuela and Syria during that year. In 2018 he participated in a hemispheric conference of peace organizations held in Moca, Dominican Republic in September, and the Executive Meeting of the World Peace Council in Damascus, Syria in October.

In November 2018, the Peace Congress convened a country-wide Convention in Toronto, at which time Figueroa was elected President, leading an 11-member Executive Committee elected at the Convention.

Figueroa v. Canada
In 1993, the fledgling CPC was still recovering from its crisis and split. The Party now had only a few hundred members, and had lost a number of assets, including the party's headquarters at 24 Cecil Street in Toronto. As a result, the CPC was not in a position to run fifty candidates in the 1993 federal election, the number required to maintain official party status because of recent changes to Canada's Elections Act. As a result, the newly relaunched CPC was deregistered by Elections Canada, and its remaining assets were seized by the government. A prolonged legal battle, Figueroa v. Canada ensued, resulting in a Supreme Court of Canada ruling in 2003 that overturned a provision in the Elections Act requiring fifty candidates for official party status (the number had been increased by an act of parliament in the intervening years). Earlier in the legal battle, the party had its deregistration overturned and its seized assets restored.

Canadian federal elections since 2000 
Figueroa has run in nine Canadian general elections and at least two provincial elections:
 1979 British Columbia general election: Figueroa ran in the two-member riding of Vancouver Centre, and finished eighth in a field of eight candidates with 237 votes. Gary Lauk and Emery Barnes of the New Democratic Party of British Columbia won.
 1984 Canadian federal election: Figueroa ran in the riding of Vancouver East, and finished last with 259 votes. Margaret Mitchell of the New Democratic Party won.
 1988 Canadian federal election: Figueroa ran in the riding of Halifax, and finished 5th in a field of 7 candidates with 151 votes. Mary Clancy of the Liberal Party of Canada won.
 1993 Canadian federal election: Figueroa ran as an independent in the riding of Parkdale—High Park, and finished 9th out of a field of 11 with 105 votes. Jesse Flis of the Liberals won.
 1995 Ontario general election: Figueroa ran in the riding of Beaches—Woodbine, and finished 5th in a field of six candidates with 169 votes. Frances Lankin of the New Democratic Party of Ontario won.
 1997 Canadian federal election: Figueroa ran as an independent in the riding of Davenport, and finished 7th in a field of 8 with 194 votes. Charles Caccia of the Liberals won.
 2000 Canadian federal election: Figueroa ran in the riding of Toronto—Danforth, and finished 9th in a field of 10 with 129 votes. Dennis Mills of the Liberals won.
 2004 Canadian federal election: Figueroa ran in the riding of Beaches—East York in Toronto, and finished 7th in a field of 8 with 62 votes. Maria Minna of the Liberals won.
 Between 2006 and 2015, Figueroa ran in every federal election in the riding of Davenport, placing fifth or sixth in each.

Electoral record

References

External links
 How the Communist Party changed Canadian elections forever, This Magazine - includes a profile of Figueroa.
A Short Biography of Miguel Figueroa at the Communist Party of Canada website

1952 births
Living people
Leaders of the Communist Party of Canada
Figuerora, Miguel
Figuerora, Miguel
Figuerora, Miguel
Figuerora, Miguel
Figuerora, Miguel
Figuerora, Miguel
Figuerora, Miguel
Canadian communists
Canadian federal political party presidents